Belize competed at the 1992 Summer Olympics in Barcelona, Spain. Ten competitors, nine men and one woman, took part in ten events in two sports.

Competitors
The following is the list of number of competitors in the Games.

Athletics 

Men
Track & road events

Field events

Cycling

Five cyclists, four men and one woman, represented Belize in 1992.

Road
Men

Women

References

External links
Official Olympic Reports

Nations at the 1992 Summer Olympics
1992
Summer Olympics